Douglas Stanford is an American theoretical physicist. He is an associate professor of physics at Stanford Institute for Theoretical Physics of Stanford University. His research interests include quantum gravity, quantum field theory and string theory. 
Stanford was awarded the 2018 New Horizons in Physics Prize by Fundamental Physics Prize Foundation for his work on improving the understanding of quantum mechanics of black holes via chaos theory.

Early life and education 
Douglas Stanford was born in Anacortes, Washington. He attended Anacortes Senior High school. Stanford graduated from the Stanford University in 2009 with B.S. in physics and mathematics. He earned an M.S. in mathematics from the University of Cambridge in 2010. He earned his Ph.D. in physics in 2014 from Stanford University, under the guidance of Leonard Susskind.

Career

Research 
Stanford worked at Institute for Advanced Study, Princeton from September 2014 to April 2019 as a post-doctoral researcher. He worked with Juan Maldacena on his and Leonard Susskind's ER-EPR conjecture of the equivalence of wormholes (the ER stands for Einstein-Rosen Bridge) and EPR for quantum entangled particle pairs. The assumption arose as a suggestion to explain the information paradox of black holes, which was heightened by the firewall paradox of Joseph Polchinski. During this time, he worked with Edward Witten on Fermionic localization of the Schwarzian theory. In 2019, Stanford joined Stanford University as an assistant professor. , he was an associate professor of physics at Stanford Institute for Theoretical Physics.

Awards and honours 
In 2017, Douglas Stanford was awarded the Blavatnik Awards for Young Scientists for his works in quantum gravity and condensed matter physics. In 2018, Stanford was awarded the New Horizons in Physics Prize by Fundamental Physics Prize Foundation for his work on improving the understanding of quantum mechanics of black holes via chaos theory. The prize is worth $100,000. In 2019, Stanford was awarded the Gribov Medal by the European Physical Society for his work on quantum chaos and its relation to the near-horizon dynamics of black holes.

Selected publications

References

External links 
 Douglas Stanford's articles in the INSPIRE-HEP database

21st-century American physicists
American string theorists
Stanford University Department of Physics faculty
Stanford University alumni
Alumni of the University of Cambridge
Scientists from Washington (state)
Stanford University faculty
Living people
Year of birth missing (living people)